168th Street may refer to:

 168th Street (Manhattan)
 168th Street station (BMT Jamaica Line), now demolished
 168th Street station (New York City Subway), serving the